José Baltazar Lava, also known as Peping or Harry, was the general secretary of the Partido Komunista ng Pilipinas-1930 (PKP), from 1948 until his arrest in 1950. He spent the following two decades in prison and another two decades in exile in Prague, Czechoslovakia.

Political career 
Lava became general secretary of the Central Committee of the PKP in May 1948, shortly after his brother Vicente Lava died. Lava was previously a politburo member and the chief of the party's finance committee.

The PKP began a violent insurrection against the government in 1948 and was banned by the government the same year. In early 1950, the PKP established the People's Liberation Army, which was made up of about 10,000 soldiers. The entire secretariat of the Central Committee of the PKP, including Lava, was arrested on October 18, 1950, following the earlier capture of the politburo in Manila. Lava was succeeded by his other brother Jesus Lava in February 1951.

Lava was sentenced to life imprisonment in May 1951. He was released from prison in January 1970 and fled to Prague, Czechoslovakia. While living in self-imposed exile, he authored several books on the communist movement in the Philippines.

After the fall of communism in Czechoslovakia in 1989, Lava returned to the Philippines in 1990 and died there in 2000.

References 

Filipino communists
Filipino exiles
Filipino revolutionaries
Communist Party of the Philippines politicians
Filipino political party founders
1912 births
2000 deaths
Expatriates in Czechoslovakia